Telluride Blues & Brews Festival is a three-day music festival held in September in the Town of Telluride, Colorado. Blues & Brews is a three-day celebration of music and microbrews held in Telluride Town Park, an outdoor music venue with 13,000 foot mountains as a backdrop. The festival offers a mix of live blues, funk, rock, jam band, gospel and soul performances, a beer Grand Tasting with 56 microbreweries, food and craft vendors, children's activities, and late night shows.

The festival features on-site camping and glamour camping ("glamping")

This festival went on hiatus in 2020.

See also

List of blues festivals
List of folk festivals

References

External links

 Telluride festival combines beer and the blues Posted 8/20/2008 Associated Press story at USA Today

Blues festivals in the United States
Beer festivals in the United States
Music festivals in Colorado
Folk festivals in the United States
Beer in Colorado
Telluride, Colorado